George H. Moore (January 20, 1878 – November 5, 1962) was a Missouri attorney and United States district judge of the United States District Court for the Eastern District of Missouri.

Education and career

Born in La Grange, Missouri, Moore received a Bachelor of Laws from the University of Missouri School of Law in 1901 and a Master of Laws from the same institution the following year. He was in private practice in St. Louis, Missouri, from 1902 to 1935, also working as a United States Collector of Internal Revenue from 1914 to 1922.

Federal judicial service

Moore was nominated by President Franklin D. Roosevelt on May 20, 1935, to a seat on the United States District Court for the Eastern District of Missouri vacated by Judge Charles Breckenridge Faris. Moore was confirmed by the United States Senate on May 28, 1935, and received his commission the following day. He served as Chief Judge from 1948 to 1959, and assumed senior status on January 19, 1962. He continued to serve as a senior judge until his death on November 5, 1962.

References

Sources
 

1878 births
1962 deaths
People from La Grange, Missouri
Lawyers from St. Louis
Judges of the United States District Court for the Eastern District of Missouri
United States district court judges appointed by Franklin D. Roosevelt
20th-century American judges